You Keep Sending 'Em Over and We'll Keep Knocking 'Em Down is a World War I song written by Sidney D. Mitchell and composed by Harry Ruby. The song was first published in 1917 by Waterson, Berlin & Snyder Co., in New York, NY. The sheet music cover depicts a soldier on top of a trench ladder uses his rifle as a club with an inset photo of Eddie Cantor.
 
The sheet music can be found at the Pritzker Military Museum & Library.

References

Bibliography
Parker, Bernard S. World War I Sheet Music 1. Jefferson: McFarland & Company, Inc., 2007. . 
Scheurer, Timothy E. 1991. Born in the USA: the myth of America in popular music from colonial times to the present. Jackson: Univ. Pr. of Mississippi.  
Vogel, Frederick G. World War I Songs: A History and Dictionary of Popular American Patriotic Tunes, with Over 300 Complete Lyrics. Jefferson: McFarland & Company, Inc., 1995. . 

1917 songs
Songs of World War I
Songs with music by Harry Ruby
Songs with lyrics by Sidney D. Mitchell